Phran Nok, also spelled Pran Nok or Prannok is a name of the street in Ban Chang Lo Subdistricts, Bangkok Noi District, Bangkok's Thonburi side. The name is also the surrounding area.

History & route
Phran Nok Road is about two km (about one mi) long. It begins in front of the Prannok Pier on the bank of Chao Phraya River, runs a short distance passing Siriraj Hospital. This part of the road was officially renamed Wang Lang Road (ถนนวังหลัง) in 2012 following a cabinet resolution to reflect its history, where the road passed was once a rear palace (Wang Lang) in the early Rattanakosin period. Then it continues running to meet Charan Sanitwong Road at Fai Chai Intersection. According to the policy of Field Marshal Plaek Phibunsongkhram, the late Prime Minister who wanted to name the roads in Thonburi Province following the name of the importance battling places where King Taksin the Great fought for Siam independent in order to commemorate and honour the King. Thereby, this road is named Phran Nok to follow the name of the first battlefield (Ban Phran Nok, currently in Uthai District, Phra Nakhon Si Ayutthaya Province), where the King defeated the Burmese army after the second invasion of Ayutthaya by the Burmese.

See more
Wang Lang Market
List of neighbourhoods in Bangkok

References

Bangkok Noi district
Streets in Bangkok
Neighbourhoods of Bangkok